Christmas Carol: The Movie is a 2001 British live action/animated film based on Charles Dickens's 1843 classic novella A Christmas Carol. Directed by Jimmy T. Murakami, the film features the voices of numerous actors including Simon Callow, Kate Winslet (who also sang the film's theme "What If"), Kate's sister Beth Winslet, and Nicolas Cage. The film was a critical and commercial failure upon release.

This version differs from others, in that Scrooge is given another chance with the love of his life, Belle, who ended their engagement in their youth after he was corrupted by greed; they later meet again after the three spirits have reformed Scrooge and he is now kind and generous, causing Belle to love him again. Both Belle and Old Joe notably have bigger roles in the film. Unlike the book as well as other film adaptations, Belle does not marry and have children with another man. She is a nurse. Old Joe is a henchman of Scrooge who arrests or robs people who owe Scrooge debt but Scrooge fires him after mending his ways.

Also in the film Marley's ghost haunts Scrooge before he goes home and Scrooge is notably younger as he has auburn hair and is middle-aged rather than being elderly. He also shows kindness towards a mouse that appears throughout the film.

Plot 
In 1867, Charles Dickens arrives at a theatre in Boston one snowy night to tell the story of "A Christmas Carol".

In Victorian London on one Christmas Eve, the merriment is not shared by a rich moneylender named Ebenezer Scrooge. Scrooge, on his way back to work from the Exchange, orders a criminal named Old Joe to arrest his debt-ridden clients, including Dr Lambert who, along with several other clients is, locked up in a debtors' prison. Belle, a middle-aged nurse and an old flame of Scrooge's, is informed by Scrooge's colleague Mr Leech that the debts have now been transferred to Scrooge. Belle goes to Scrooge's office, only for him to be out on business. Belle gives a letter to Scrooge's clerk. Bob Cratchit, before leaving to visit Dr Lambert in prison.

That night, Scrooge refuses to dine with his nephew Fred and deliberately pours a bucket of cold water over Bob's youngest son Tiny Tim, who was only discharged from hospital by Dr Lambert, and gets pnemounia. After Bob leaves for home, Scrooge is haunted by the ghost of his late business partner, Jacob Marley, who wears a chain as punishment for his selfishness when he was alive. He warns Scrooge that he will be haunted by three spirits, and that the first of these will call at one o'clock in the morning. Despite this, Scrooge continues his selfish ways by refusing to donate money to two men of business, admitting that he supports the prisons and workhouses, and even claims that the poor are better off dead and should die to 'decrease the surplus population'.

When Scrooge goes to bed, he encounters the Ghost of Christmas Past, who takes him back to his youth. Scrooge witnesses when he was unwanted in school by his father, James Emanuel Scrooge, until his sister Fan came to collect him, claiming their father has changed, and also introduces him to Belle. It turns out that Scrooge's father still despises him and sends him off to Fezziwig's to be an apprentice. Scrooge then witnesses when he was happy under Fezziwig, who treated him like a son, before Scrooge and the spirit witness a Christmas party which includes Fan, her husband Fredrick, and Belle. However, young Scrooge, after being left the inheritance by his late father, shows his greedy side, whilst Fan, who is pregnant with Fred, is implied to be driven to poverty (as their father disowned her as he did not approve of her marriage to Fredrick) and dies after Fred is born. Scrooge then sees when Belle, who he was engaged to, leave him due to his changed ways.

The next spirit, the Ghost of Christmas Present, shows Scrooge how others keep Christmas, including Fred and the Cratchits. Tiny Tim, who is ailing with pnemounia, concerns Scrooge, but the spirit sarcastically tells Scrooge that he is better off dead, and uses Scrooge's previous unkind remarks of the surplus population.

The final spirit, the Ghost of Christmas Yet to Come, shows Scrooge what will happen in the future if he does not repent: Tim dies with his family mourning him, and a dead man who is robbed and spoken of negatively is Scrooge himself after seeing his 'grave'. The ghost of Marley returns him to the present, where Scrooge at first does not change, but after seeing his 'chains' via a mirror, quickly repents and hires a boy to buy and deliver a goose to the Cratchits. Scrooge becomes a kinder man, and is praised by the ghosts of the Past and Present. However, Scrooge becomes guilt-ridden when the children's hospital that Belle and Dr Lambert work at evicts its child patients due to his previous wickedness, prompting him to fire Old Joe. Scrooge is confronted by Belle, and Scrooge promises her that he will make up for his sins and the pair reunite as a couple.

The next day, Scrooge promotes Bob to become his new partner, replacing Marley, and promises to help his family as well as, giving him a raise and becomes a stepfather to a now-well Tiny Tim, and everything returns to normal, thanks to Scrooge changing his ways.

Voice cast 
Simon Callow – Charles Dickens/Ebenezer Scrooge (voice)
Kate Winslet – Belle (voice) 
Nicolas Cage – Jacob Marley (voice) 
Jane Horrocks – Ghost of Christmas Past (voice) 
Michael Gambon – Ghost of Christmas Present (voice) 
Rhys Ifans – Bob Cratchit (voice) 
Juliet Stevenson – Emily Cratchit (voice) 
Robert Llewellyn – Old Joe (voice) 
Iain Jones – Fred (voice)
Beth Winslet – Fan (voice) 
Colin McFarlane – Albert Fezziwig (voice)
Arthur Cox – Dr. Lambert (voice)
Keith Wickham – Mr. Leach/Undertaker (voices)
Joss Sanglier – Choir Master (voice)
Sarah Annison – Mice Voice No. 1 (voice)
Rosalie MacCraig – Mice Voice No. 2 (voice)

Production
A Christmas Carol was directed by Jimmy Murakami, who helmed the Oscar-nominated The Snowman and When the Wind Blows in the 1980s. The animation was carried out by several companies across Great Britain, the Czech Republic, Poland, Estonia, Spain and South Korea. It is bookended by live-action sequences featuring Simon Callow as Charles Dickens, who reads his tale to a Boston theatre audience. However, in certain DVD releases, the live action scenes are cut. Callow would play Dickens again three years later in 2005 in the Doctor Who episode "The Unquiet Dead".

Release and reception
Christmas Carol was released on 7 December 2001 by Pathé in the UK, although it was originally slated for 30 November. In the United States, Metro-Goldwyn-Mayer released it straight to video on VHS and on Region 1 DVD on 7 October 2003 in full screen. The film was largely panned by critics, holding a rating of 13% on Rotten Tomatoes. After viewing it at the Toronto International Film Festival, Variety's Todd McCarthy wrote: "[The] character animation is dully inexpressive, and two obnoxious mute mice do more scampering and gesticulating than Harpo Marx did in his entire career."

See also
 List of A Christmas Carol adaptations
 List of Christmas films
 List of ghost films
 List of animated feature-length films

References

External links
 
 
 

2001 films
2001 animated films
Animated Christmas films
British animated films
British Christmas films
Pathé films
Film4 Productions films
Films based on A Christmas Carol
Films set in the Victorian era
Films with live action and animation
Animated films based on novels
2000s Christmas films
Films directed by Jimmy T. Murakami
2000s English-language films
2000s British films